is a railway station in the town of Nagiso, Nagano Prefecture, Japan, operated by Central Japan Railway Company (JR Tōkai).

Lines

Layout
The station has two opposed ground-level  side platforms connected by a footbridge. The station is unattended.

Platforms

Adjacent stations

|-
!colspan=5|

History
Tadachi Station began as "Tadachi Signal Stop" on 3 December 1929. It was elevated to a full passenger station on 1 September 1948. On 25 May 1973, the station was relocated to its present address, 150 meters in the direction of Sakashita Station from its original location. On 1 April 1987, it became part of JR Tōkai.

Passenger statistics
In fiscal 2014, the station was used by an average of 524 passengers daily (boarding passengers only).

Surrounding area
Tadachi Post Office
Kiso River

See also

 List of Railway Stations in Japan

References

Railway stations in Japan opened in 1948
Railway stations in Nagano Prefecture
Stations of Central Japan Railway Company
Chūō Main Line
Nagiso, Nagano